Max Greenfield (born September 4, 1979) is an American actor. He appeared in recurring roles in Veronica Mars and Ugly Betty. He co-starred as Schmidt in the Fox sitcom New Girl, for which he received nominations at the Primetime Emmy Awards, the Golden Globe Awards, and the Critics' Choice Television Awards. Since 2018, Greenfield has portrayed Dave Johnson in the CBS sitcom The Neighborhood.

He voiced Roger in the Ice Age franchise, and numerous characters in the shows Bob's Burgers, Robot Chicken and BoJack Horseman.

Early life
Greenfield was born and raised in Dobbs Ferry, New York. He is Jewish and had a Saturday Night Live-themed Bar Mitzvah. He graduated from Dobbs Ferry High School in 1998. At DFHS, Greenfield played wide receiver for the football team.

Career
Greenfield began pursuing an acting career in 1998 after he graduated from high school. He landed guest appearances on dramas such as Boston Public, Gilmore Girls and The O.C. Greenfield scored his first lead role on the short-lived series Modern Men as one of three bachelors who hire a life coach to help them understand women. Greenfield had more success in supporting roles on Veronica Mars (reprising the role in the film adaptation in 2014) and Greek. In 2007 he landed a recurring role on Ugly Betty. He made other guest-starring appearances on the remake of Melrose Place, the short-lived No Ordinary Family, and Castle.

He created, produced, and starred in the comedy series The Gentlemen's League for the Audience Network in 2010, which followed the real-life fantasy football league he ran with actor Jerry Ferrara. Greenfield had his feature film debut in the film Cross Bronx. Greenfield had a featured role in When Do We Eat?, as an Internet tycoon who, after losing his fortune, becomes a Hasidic Jew. In 2011, Greenfield began playing the role of Schmidt in the sitcom New Girl. The role earned him nominations for both a Primetime Emmy Award for Outstanding Supporting Actor in a Comedy Series and a Golden Globe Award for Best Supporting Actor – Series, Miniseries or Television Film.

In 2015, Greenfield starred in a series of McDonald's commercials promoting their Sirloin Third Pound Burgers, portraying the Hamburglar.

In 2018, Greenfield was cast in the lead role of Dave Johnson in the CBS comedy The Neighborhood. He took over the role from Josh Lawson, who played the character in the pilot episode. On November 8, 2018, it was announced that Greenfield is set to reprise his role as Leo D'Amato in the 8-episode revival series of Veronica Mars. In the same year, Greenfield was cast in the recurring role of the Denouement brothers on the third season of the Netflix comedy drama series A Series of Unfortunate Events.

Philanthropy
Greenfield has worked with Young Storytellers Foundation on numerous occasions, stating that his own kids have inspired him to help children find self-confidence and creativity.

Personal life
He has been married to casting director Tess Sanchez since 2008. They have two children, a daughter Lilly and a son Ozzie.

Filmography

Film

Television

References

External links

 
 

1979 births
Living people
20th-century American male actors
21st-century American male actors
American male film actors
American male television actors
American male voice actors
Jewish American male actors
Male actors from New York (state)
People from Dobbs Ferry, New York
21st-century American Jews